The following lists events that happened during 1999 in Cape Verde.

Incumbents
President: António Mascarenhas Monteiro
Prime Minister: Carlos Veiga

Events
National Library of Cape Verde first opened in Praia
July: Banco Inter-Atlântico opened its headquarters in Praia
7 August: A domestic TACV Flight 5002 from São Pedro Airport to Agostinho Neto Airport crashed into a mountain on Santo Antão island, killing the 16 passengers and 2 crew members on board.

Arts and entertainment
May 25: Cesária Évora's seventh album Café Atlantico released

Sports
GD Amarantes won the Cape Verdean Football Championship

References

 
Years of the 20th century in Cape Verde
1990s in Cape Verde
Cape Verde
Cape Verde